Zllash is a mountain in eastern Kosovo, 9 miles east of the capital city of Pristina.

There is also a village with the same name.

Notes

References

Mountains of Kosovo